Esfanjeh (also known as Isfanjeh and Esfanjak) is a village in Khorram Dasht Rural District, Kamareh District, Khomeyn County, Markazi Province, Iran. At the 2006 census, its population was 208, in 53 families.

References 

Populated places in Khomeyn County